The men's freestyle 58 kilograms is a competition featured at the 1999 World Wrestling Championships, and was held at the Atatürk Sport Hall in Ankara, Turkey from 8 to 10 October 1999.

Results
Legend
F — Won by fall

Preliminary round

Pool 1

Pool 2

Pool 3

Pool 4

Pool 5

Pool 6

Pool 7

Pool 8

Pool 9

Pool 10

Pool 11

Knockout round

References

Men's freestyle 58 kg